The Henry Fork is a tributary of the West Fork Little Kanawha River,  long, in west-central West Virginia in the United States.

The Henry Fork rises southeast of the community of Tariff in southeastern Roane County and flows generally northward, through Tariff and Linden.  From the mouth of its tributary the Beech Fork, it flows along the boundary of Roane and Calhoun counties for the remainder of its course, to its mouth at Rocksdale, where it flows into the West Fork from the south.

See also
List of rivers of West Virginia

References 

Rivers of West Virginia
Little Kanawha River
Rivers of Calhoun County, West Virginia
Rivers of Roane County, West Virginia